Shaheed Fazil Rahoo (1934 – 17 January 1987) was a Political leader and one of the most famous peasant leaders in Sindh. He was born in 1934 at village Rahuki, district Badin of Sindh Pakistan. He struggled throughout his life and remained imprisoned for several years and was finally assassinated on 17 January 1987 in back bone.

Early life 
Fazil Rahu was born in the year 1934 at Rahuki, a village in district Badin of Sindh, Pakistan.

Entrance in formal politics 

Rahu won B.D. Elections in 1962 and later in 1965 to become the chairman of Union Council Taraai. He initiated the "Publish Voter Lists in Sindhi" movement in 1969. The foundation of Sindhi Awaami Tehreek was laid and Fazil Rahu was elected President of Awaami Tehreek after Hafeez Qureshi in a Sindhi Qaumi Convention at Hyderabad in 1970. Fazil Rahu in a joint effort with his fellow members, organized a Sindhi Language Convention in Jaamia Arabia High School, Hyderabad in 1971. Staged a massive "Haari Conference" where thousands of people gathered at his native village Rahuki in October 1979. He and his son Late Muhammad Siddique Rahu were jailed for holding a peaceful political conference at Rahuki in October 1979. Supported and fought the case of Sindhi people during Sindhi-Muhaajir riots in 1983. Addressed a huge gathering under the platform of M.R.D at Badin, in 1983. Was given poisonous capsules in Landhi Jail through a prisoner, and in the meanwhile that prisoner was secretly moved from Landhi Jail to somewhere else in order to conceal the real culprits behind that ulterior motive. In the same night, Fazil Rahu was shifted to Sukkur Jail in the state of unconsciousness instead of rescuing him to any hospital. Mobilized the people on all levels starting from his own home where his whole family was actively involved in political scenario. The women participated through the platform of "Sindhiani Tehreek", youth was involved through "Sindhi Shagird Tehreek" and the children also were an active part of "Sujaag Baar Tehreek". Fazil Rahu led by example. He himself, his wife, son, two daughters and many family members had to face voluntary and forced, political imprisonment at numerous occasion throughout his political life.

Honors and awards 
General Secretary, Sindhi Awaami Tehreek (now Qomi Awaami Tehreek)
Senior Vice President, ANP (Awaami National Party)
President, Sindhi Haari Tehreek
Joint Secretary, M.R.D Movement (Sindh) in 1982
Front Line Leader, Remove Censorship Movement (Journalists Movement)

Movements 
Anti-One Unit Movement (March, 1968)
Movement of Publishing Voter Lists in Sindh (1969) 
Sindhi Awaami Tehreek (1970)
Stop Auction Movement (Neelam Band Karyo Tehreek, March, 1970)
Stop Oppression Movement (Zulam Band Karyo Tehreek, 1970)
Sindhi Haari Committee (1974 at Hyderabad)
M.R.D. Movement
Jail Bharyo Tehreek
Remove Censorship Movement ("Shaafi Tehreek" Journalists Movement in Zia-ul-Haq's dictatorship)

Imprisonments 
Fazil Rahu was imprisoned at various periods in his life. Among the prisons he had to face were Naara Jail Hyderabad, Mach Jail Baluchistan, Landhi Jail Karachi, Kot Lakhpat Jail, Central Jail Karachi, Central Jail Sukkur, Central Jail Hyderabad, Khairpur, District Jail Badin etc.

Assassination 
Fazil Rahu was martyred in a premeditated conspiracy by an axe attack on the back of his head at city Golarchi (Now Shaheed Fazil Rahu) on 17 January 1987 at 02.00 p.m.

References

External links 

1935 births
1987 deaths
Articles with hCards
Assassinated Pakistani politicians
Sindhi people